Robin Hibu (born 1 July 1968) is a serving IPS officer of 1993 (47RR) batch of AGMUT cadre. Hibu is currently posted as Special Commissioner of Police at Delhi Armed Police . Hibu was also the CSO (chief security officer) at Rastrapati Bhavan. Hibu also holds the position as managing director at Delhi Police Housing Corporation.

Early life and education 
Hibu was born and brought up in a small village named 'Hong' in Ziro Valley of Arunachal Pradesh. Hibu has a master's degree in sociology from the Jawaharlal Nehru University.

Police career 
Hibu joined as an IPS officer in 1993. He is the first IPS officer from Arunachal Pradesh.

Hibu also served as the Joint commnissioner of Police, New Delhi. Hibu, in his posting at New Delhi, always raised his concern about women's safety and against racism towards North-East Indian people residing in Delhi. Hibu, even left his personal mobile on social media platforms so that North-eastern people can contact him immediately whenever they are in problems.

Hibu, during the Covid-19 pandemic, encouraged citizens to work without any fear as he was also helping the victims.

As reported by Navbharat Times, Hibu doesn't own any house, car, or two-wheeler despite being an IPS officer.

Interviews and Commentaries 
In an interview with The Hindu, Robin Hibu raised concern about females' safety in the current era.

Social activities 
Hibu runs an NGO 'Helping Hands' to serve the North-east Indian citizens in distress. The NGO also provided oxygen in Delhi during the Covid-19. Noted Indian boxer and Rajya Sabha MP Mary Kom also supported Hibu's NGO Helping Hands and provided financial support to Northeastern COVID-19 patients in Delhi.

Awards 
 UN Peace Medal for Meritorious Services in Bosnia – 1998
 Samajik Ratna Puraskar – 2007
 President’s Police Medal for Distinguished Services in 2010 and 2017.  
 Global Mahatma Gandhi Award, 2019. 
 Ati Utkrisht Seva Padak.
 Best IPS Officer Award (Newspapers Association of India ).
 Antrik Suraksha Seva Padak

Further reading 
 Hibu's Biography by 
 IGP Robin Hibu gets honoured with President of India Distinguish Service Medal again
 Dos & don'ts in Delhi irk N-E students

External Links 
 Website of Robin Hibu's NGO Helping Hands
 MANAGING PEACEFUL MASS AGITATIONS BY POLICE

References 

Indian Police Service officers
People from Arunachal Pradesh
Jawaharlal Nehru University alumni
1968 births
Living people